Mae is an unincorporated community in Beulah Township, Cass County, Minnesota, United States, near Outing and Emily. It is located along Cass County Road 58, near Morrison Lake Road NE.

References

Unincorporated communities in Cass County, Minnesota
Unincorporated communities in Minnesota